The 2017 EMF Euro was the eighth edition of the EMF miniEURO for national Small-sided football teams, and the fifth governed by the European Minifootball Federation. It took place in Brno, Czech Republic, from 9 to 17 June 2017.

The final tournament was contested by 24 teams.

Draw 
The final tournament draw was held in Hotel Bobycentrum in Brno on 29 March 2017.

Group stage

Group A

Group B

Group C

Group D

Group E

Group F

Ranking of third-placed teams

Knockout stage

Bracket

Round of 16

Quarter-finals

Semi finals

Bronze medal game

Final

Final ranking

Goalscorers 
There have been 178 goals scored in 52 matches, for an average of 3.42 goals per match.

5 goals

 Ivan Smok
 Patrik Levčík
 Michal Salák
 Mirko Klikovac

4 goals

 Nikolaos Stamos
 Ariel Mnochy
 Vlad Claudiu

3 goals

 Goran Lovrinović
 Josip Gusković
 Jan Koudelka
 Omar Belbachir
 Valerii Likhobabenko
 Veselin Guberinić
 Dejan Kos

2 goals

 Robert Đotlo
 Marin Jukić
 Dobrin Mihaylov
 Mario Orlović
 Ondřej Paděra
 Michal Uhlíř
 Stanislav Mařík
 Jérôme Boulin
 Bruno Meilhon
 Christophe Perrin
 Ferenc Béres
 Imre Lak
 Oleg Kuzmin
 Murat Akhmetsharipov
 Olzhas Taibassarov
 Ivan Tomašević
 Calugareanu George Adrian
 Vincene Toma
 Burciu Radu Marian
 Erik Korchagin
 Aleksei Medvedev
 Ludovit Felix
 Silvestr Jager
 Erik Szabo 
 Amar Jamaković
 Ogün Bayrak 
 Artem Gordienko

1 goal

 Alix Gilsoul
 Andreas Berović
 Marko Vujica
 Mirza Zahirović
 Nedelyan Kostadinov
 Martin Kostov
 Georgi Nedyalkov
 Nikolay Petrov
 Aleksey Stepanov
 Antun Hercigonja
 Zoran Lukavečki
 Bohumír Doubravský
 František Hakl
 Tomáš Mica
 David Bednář
 Sergi Talavera Codina
 Marcos Menéndez García
 Pablo Ardura García
 Elie Dohin
 Nicolas Huertos
 Nicolas Le
 Labaig Romain
 Mickael Senac
 Kevin Hildach
 Gerbi Kaplan
 Dominic Reinold
 Florian Thamm
 Jörg Wagner
 Stefanos Giotis
 Dimitrios Gkialis
 Imre Bozsoki
 Richárd Cseszneki
 Róbert Fekete
 Csaba Poncok
 Szabolcs Somogyi
 Márkó Sós
 Zsolt Szabó
 Massimiliano Berardini
 Saverio Mastrojanni
 Sharon Adani
 Yehonatan Zeharia
 Nurzhan Abdrassilov
 Kassim Boziyev
 Azamat Khassenov
 Andrejs Sitiks 
 Saša Vukčević
 Bartłomiej Dębicki
 Cezary Szałek 
 João Paulo
 Pusca Costin Cristian
 Bobe Bogdan Gabriel
 Tanase Gabriel
 Popa Ioan Mircea
 Leu Stefan
 Sergey Faustov
 Aleksandr Kuksov
 Anton Kulagin
 Mikhail Merkulov
 Dejan Jevtić
 Dragan Mitrović
 Ivan Buchel
 Martin Mráz
 Matej Vašíček
 Mak Karabegović
 David Šajnović
 Barış Demir
 Hakan Gönül
 Mehmet Kurt
 Pavlo Bovtunenko

References

External links
 Official EMF website
 EMF Euro official website

2017
International association football competitions hosted by the Czech Republic
2017 in European sport
2017 in Czech sport
Sport in Brno